NLEX Corporation (formerly Manila North Tollways Corporation) is a subsidiary of Metro Pacific Tollways Corporation (MPTC), a company owned by Metro Pacific Investments Corporation. It holds the concession rights to construct, operate and maintain the North Luzon Expressway (NLEX) and Subic–Clark–Tarlac Expressway (SCTEX). The company was acquired by the Metro Pacific group from the Lopez Group of Companies in 2008.

MNTC–TMC merger
In November 2016, MNTC shareholders approved its merger with Tollways Management Corporation (TMC), with MNTC as the surviving company. TMC was engaged in the operations and maintenance of tollways, its facilities, interchanges and related works. The shareholders also approved the change of the name of MNTC to NLEX Corporation. The SEC approved the name change on February 13, 2017.

Basketball teams
 NLEX Road Warriors (Philippine Basketball Association)
 NLEX Road Warriors (PBA D-League)
 NLEX (Pilipinas Commercial Basketball League)

References

External links
NLEX Corporation

Transportation companies of the Philippines
Companies based in Caloocan